Deppea is a genus of flowering plants in the family Rubiaceae. The genus is found in Mexico, Central America and from Brazil to northeastern Argentina.

Species

 Deppea amaranthina Standl. & Steyerm.
 Deppea amaranthoides Borhidi
 Deppea anisophylla L.O.Williams
 Deppea arachnipoda (Borhidi & Salas-Mor.) Borhidi
 Deppea blumenaviensis (K.Schum.) Lorence
 Deppea cornifolia (Benth.) Benth.
 Deppea densiflora Borhidi & Reyes-Garcia
 Deppea ehrenbergii Standl.
 Deppea erythrorhiza Schltdl. & Cham.
 Deppea foliosa Borhidi, Salas-Mor. & E.Martinez
 Deppea grandiflora Schltdl.
 Deppea guerrerensis Dwyer & Lorence
 Deppea hamelioides Standl.
 Deppea hernandezii Lorence
 Deppea hintonii Bullock
 Deppea hoffmannioides Borhidi
 Deppea inaequalis Standl. & Steyerm.
 Deppea keniae Borhidi & Saynes
 Deppea longifolia Borhidi
 Deppea martinez-calderonii Lorence
 Deppea microphylla Greenm.
 Deppea nitida Borhidi & Salas-Mor.
 Deppea oaxacana Lorence
 Deppea obtusiflora (Benth.) Benth.
 Deppea pauciflora Borhidi & E.Martinez
 Deppea pubescens Hemsl.
 Deppea purpurascens Lorence
 Deppea purpusii Standl.
 Deppea rubrinervis Borhidi
 Deppea rupicola Borhidi
 Deppea serboi Borhidi & K.Velasco
 Deppea sousae Borhidi
 Deppea splendens  Breedlove (syn. Csapodya splendens)
 Deppea tenuiflora Benth.
 Deppea tubaeana Borhidi
 Deppea umbellata Hemsl.

References

External links
Deppea in the World Checklist of Rubiaceae

Rubiaceae genera
Hamelieae
Flora of Central America
Flora of South America